North Woodlawn Cemetery, an African-American cemetery located east of Interstate 95 near Sunrise Boulevard in Fort Lauderdale, Florida. It was added to the National Register of Historic Places on 29 November 2017. Founded in the 1920s, lynch victim Reuben Stacey was buried there in 1935. An area that may have been unmarked graves was built over in the construction of Interstate 95 in the 1970s. Another section of unmarked graves of infants may have been paved over in 1995. Burials no longer take place there. Maintained by the City of Fort Lauderdale, it was restored in 2002.

References

External links
 
 

Cemeteries in Florida
Fort Lauderdale, Florida
National Register of Historic Places in Broward County, Florida
African-American history of Florida
African-American cemeteries in Florida
1920s establishments in Florida